Olise is a surname. Notable people with the surname include:

Michael Olise (born 2001), British football midfielder
Mie Olise (born 1974), Danish artist